Museum of Cultures may refer to:

 Museum of Cultures (Basel), in the city of Basel, Switzerland
 Museum of Cultures (Lugano), in the city of Lugano, Switzerland
 Museum of Cultures (Mexico), in Mexico City, Mexico
 Museum of Cultures (Milan) (MUDEC), in Milan, Italy